Gelatiniphilus is a Gram-negative, non-spore-forming, rod-shaped and non-motile genus of bacteria from the family of Flavobacteriaceae with one known species (Gelatiniphilus marinus). Gelatiniphilus marinus has been isolated from the microalga Picochlorum sp.

References

Flavobacteria
Bacteria genera
Monotypic bacteria genera
Taxa described in 2016